Several celebrities have appeared on the ITV cookery show, Daily Cooks Challenge. The following is a list of such appearances.

Season 1

Season 2

Season 3

Season 4

References

Daily Cooks Challenge